Armentano is a surname. Notable people with the surname include:

Amedeo Rocco Armentano (1886–1966), Italian esotericist
Anthony J. Armentano (1916–1987), American politician
Mariano Armentano (born 1974), Argentine footballer
Paul Armentano, American cannabis activist
Ricardo Armentano (born 1957), Uruguayan professor and researcher

Italian-language surnames